Sahmui-ye Shomali (also Romanized as Sahmūī-ye Shomālī; also known as Sahmoo Shomali, Sahmū Shemālī, and Sahmū-ye Shomālī) is a village in Chah-e Mobarak Rural District, Chah-e Mobarak District, Asaluyeh County, Bushehr Province, Iran. At the 2006 census, its population was 952, in 126 families.

References 

Populated places in Asaluyeh County